Heather Conkie is a veteran Canadian television writer and producer who began her career as an actress. She was featured in multiple children's shows in the 1980s on TVOntario beginning first with Polka Dot Door.

Her first screenwriting credit was for Beethoven Lives Upstairs (1992). She has subsequently worked extensively as a writer for numerous television series in Canada including Road to Avonlea, 7th Heaven, The Zack Files, Pit Pony, Dark Oracle and Heartland, as well as several made for television movies.

As an on-screen performer, she was the host of Report Canada and Music Box. She played two characters (the main character, and her landlady Agnes Peabody) in a music-education show called It's Mainly Music. She reprised the role of Agnes Peabody in a spin-off show called Dear Aunt Agnes.

External links

Canadian children's television presenters
20th-century Canadian screenwriters
Canadian television actresses
Canadian television producers
Canadian women television producers
Canadian television writers
Canadian women screenwriters
Canadian women television writers
Living people
Place of birth missing (living people)
Year of birth missing (living people)
Canadian women television personalities
20th-century Canadian women writers
21st-century Canadian screenwriters
21st-century Canadian women writers